The Hauke-Bosak (more commonly called Hauke) family was originally a German middle class family of German origin which, after having settled in Poland at the end of the 18th century, achieved great importance and titles of nobility in Congress Poland.

A short history of the family
The first known ancestor of the Hauke family was Johann Gaspar Hauck, a registrar at the Imperial Chamber Court of the Holy Roman Empire in Wetzlar, who  died in 1722 and was buried in his home town. By his wife Johanna Barbara of an unknown maiden name, he had ten children, of whom two sons, Johann Valentin (1698–1722) and Ignatz Marianus (1706–1784), came to important positions: Johann continued the family tradition of employment at the Court of Justice in Wetzlar, while Ignatz became a secretary to the Government of the Electorate of Mainz.

Ignatz, too, had many children, nine, with his wife Maria Franziska Riedesel zu Eisenbach, who was an illegitimate (later acknowledged) daughter of Baron Georg Riedesel zu Eisenbach, a member of one of the oldest Hessian noble families. One of their sons, Johann Friedrich Michael Hauck (born 1737 in Mainz, died 1810 in Warsaw) moved to Saxony and later to Poland as a secretary of the powerful Count Alois Friedrich von Brühl, Starost of Warsaw, General of the Royal Polish Artillery and son of Heinrich von Brühl, the famous Saxon-Polish minister.

In 1782, Count Alois von Brühl sold his Polish dignities and estates and returned to Saxony, but Johann Friedrich stayed in Warsaw with his family of seven children by an Alsatian Protestant preacher's daughter, Maria Salomé Schweppenhäuser (1755–1833). Having changed his Christian names to the more Polish sounding Fryderyk Karol Emanuel and his surname to Hauke, Fryderyk Karol Emanuel Hauke had considerable success as owner of a private school and later as teacher of the German language and mathematics at an exclusive Prussian school for boys, called Warsaw Lycaeum.

Three of Hauke's sons, John Maurice, Ludwik August (1779–1851) and Joseph (1790–1837), entered after 1815 the service of the Czar, who was at the same time King of Congress Poland, achieved very high positions and received titles and rights od Polish nobility in 1826. The coat of arms awarded to them received in accordance to the Polish custom of naming arms the name "Bosak" (Grappling hook), which one member of the family, Joseph, later used as a pseudonym. John Maurice (in 1829) and Joseph (in 1830), both of them Generals, were elevated to the rank of counts of the Russian Empire. In 1861, the branch of Ludwik August followed, having obtained an Austrian confirmation of the title of Count awarded to General Alexander Hauke (1814–1868), who married his cousin Sophie (1816–1861), a daughter of John Maurice and sister to Julia von Battenberg and Catarina Hauke.

The branches of John Maurice and Joseph became extinct in male line in 1852 respectively in 1949, the branch of Ludwik and Alexander still flourishes. Its descendants all live in Stockholm except one, who is a Dominican prior in Poznań. They left Poland and settled in Sweden about 1960, aided by their relative, Queen Louise of Sweden.

Most of the Haukes living in Warsaw in the first half of the 19th century are buried at the  Catholic Powązki Cemetery in Warsaw, those who were Lutherans or Calvinists (mostly Protestant women who married into the family) repose at the Lutheran and Calvinist Cemeteries of the Polish capital. Solely John Maurice and his wife lie in the crypt of the Capucin church in Warsaw's Old Town.

Known members of the family
John Maurice Hauke, General
Julia von Battenberg, Princess
Józef Hauke-Bosak, General

Sources
Stanisław Łoza, Rodziny polskie pochodzenia cudzoziemskiego zamieszkale w Warszawie i okolicach, vol. 2, Warsaw 1934
Baron Constantin Stackelberg, Genealogy of the Hauke Family, Washington D.C. 1955
Information from Count Zygmunt de Hauke, Stockholm

Polish noble families
Russian noble families
Polish people of German descent